Bengtsson is Swedish surname originating in a patronymic, meaning "son of Bengt" (Benedict), Bengt meaning "Blessed". The name is sometimes written Bengtson (a form frequently adopted by migrants to the United States). Other forms occur, such as Bengtzon, Bankson, Bankston, Benson, Bengston or Benktsson.

Bengtsson is the 15th most common surname in Sweden.

Notable people with the surname include:

Anders Bengtsson (born 1968), Swedish politician and member of parliament
Angelica Bengtsson (born 1993), Swedish pole vaulter
Bengt Bengtsson (1897–1977), Swedish gymnast
Bengt-Åke Bengtsson (born 1938), Swedish rower
Birgitta Bengtsson (born 1965), Swedish sailor
Björn Bengtsson (born 1973), Swedish actor
Catrine Bengtsson (born 1969), Swedish badminton player
Christopher Bengtsson (born 1993), Swedish professional ice hockey player
Emma Bengtsson, Swedish chef
Erik G. Bengtsson (born 1928), Swedish Army lieutenant general
Erling Blöndal Bengtsson (1932–2013), Danish cellist
Frans G. Bengtsson (1894–1954), Swedish author
Gabriel Bengtsson (born 1977), Swedish judoka
Göran Bengtsson (born 1956), Swedish handball player
Gösta Bengtsson (1897–1984), Swedish sailor
Gunder Bengtsson (1946–2019), Swedish football coach
Håkan Bengtsson (born 1942), Swedish swimmer
Ingemund Bengtsson (1919–2000), Swedish politician and Speaker of the Riksdag 1979–1988
Jan-Olof Bengtsson (born 1952), Swedish journalist
Johan Bengtsson (born 1979), Swedish bassist
Kristin Bengtsson (born 1970), Swedish female footballer
Lennart Bengtsson (born 1935), Swedish meteorologist
Margot Bengtsson (born 1943), Swedish psychologist and feminist scholar
Maria Bengtsson (badminton) (born 1964), Swedish badminton player
Maria Bengtsson (soprano) (born 1975)
 Martin Bengtsson (musician), Swedish heavy metal musician
 Martin Bengtsson (footballer)
Mikael Bengtsson (born 1981), Swedish footballer
Per Bengtsson (born 1967), Swedish speed skater
Per-Inge Bengtsson (born 1961), Swedish sprint canoer
Pierre Bengtsson (born 1988), Swedish footballer
Rasmus Bengtsson (born 1986), Swedish footballer
Robin Bengtsson (born 1990), Swedish singer
Rolf-Göran Bengtsson (born 1962), Swedish horse rider and silver medalist in Individual Jumping at the 2008 Beijing Olympic Games
Stellan Bengtsson (born 1952), Swedish table tennis player
Sylve Bengtsson (1930–2005), Swedish footballer
Thomas Bengtsson, Swedish magician better known under his stage name Tom Stone

Similar spellings

Jerry Bengtson (born 1987), Honduran footballer
John Bengtson (born 1948), U.S. linguist
Phil Bengtson (1913–1994), U.S. American football player

Bengtsson as a middle name
Jöns Bengtsson Oxenstierna, 15th-century Swedish archbishop

References

Swedish-language surnames
Patronymic surnames